Ronaldo Monteiro Pedraza (born 11 January 1998) is a Bolivian football player who plays as forward for San José in Liga de Fútbol Profesional Boliviano.

Personal life
Monteiro was born in Bolivia, and his father is a Brazilian former footballer.

References

1998 births
Living people
People from Santa Cruz de la Sierra
Bolivian footballers
Bolivian people of Brazilian descent
Bolivian Primera División players
Club Bolívar players
Club Real Potosí players
Club Always Ready players
Association football forwards